Amadinone acetate (developmental code name RS-2208), also known as 19-norchlormadinone acetate, is a steroidal progestin of the 19-norprogesterone and 17α-hydroxyprogesterone groups that was never marketed. It is the acetate ester of amadinone, which, similarly, was never marketed.

See also
 Chlormadinone acetate
 List of progestogen esters

References

Abandoned drugs
Acetate esters
Norpregnanes
Organochlorides
Progestogen esters
Progestogens